Yulia Berger (born 5 August 1991) is an artistic gymnast. She won the silver medal on vault at the 2009 European Championships.

References

1991 births
Living people
Russian female artistic gymnasts
Gymnasts from Moscow
21st-century Russian women